The 2009–10 KHL season was the second season of the Kontinental Hockey League. It was held from 10 September 2009 to 27 April 2010, with a break for the Olympic winter games from 8 February to 3 March. Ak Bars Kazan defended their title by defeating Western conference winners HC MVD in a seven-game play-off final.

League changes 
On 16 June 2009, the KHL Board of Directors approved several changes to the league for the 2009–10 season.

 Team changes
The league admitted a new team, Avtomobilist Yekaterinburg. Khimik Voskresensk did not play in the 2009–10 season due to financial problems, but they retained KHL membership and may return at a later date, meanwhile playing in the Russian Major League. Overall, the number of teams playing in 2009–10 remained at 24.

 Division realignment
Teams were geographically aligned to aid travel conditions. The league were divided into a Western and an Eastern conference, each containing two divisions of six teams. Each team played the other teams in the same division 4 times (for a total of 20 games) and each team in the other divisions 2 times (for a total of 36 games). The regular season thus consisted of 56 games for every team.

 Play-off structure
The top eight teams from each conference qualified for the play-offs. Division winners were awarded the top two seeds.
In each conference quarterfinals, semifinals and finals will be played and the conference winners play for the Gagarin Cup. Conference quarterfinals were best-of-five series, the remaining rounds best-of-seven series. Overtime periods last 20 minutes or until the sudden death goal.

 Salary cap
The aggregate income of all players of a team was limited to 620 million rubles (~US$20 million). Minimum aggregate salary for the players was 200 million rubles (~US$6.5 million). Each teams was allowed one "franchise player" exception, who did not count towards the cap.

 Rosters
25 players are allowed to be in the major team roster and 25 in the junior team roster of every club. The number of foreign players is restricted to 5, at most one of them as goaltender.

 Junior league
The league implemented a more advanced and organized junior hockey sub-league to focus on development. It features players from 17 to 21 years of age.

 Entry draft
On 1 June 2009, the inaugural entry draft for the KHL was held. Each team's hockey school was able to protect 25 players from the 17-21 agegroup prior to the draft.

Goal crease
Goal crease was shrunk to the NHL dimensions.

Regular season
The regular season started on 10 September 2009 with the "Opening Cup" and ended on 7 March 2010. A few small breaks for the national team and the All-Star game as well as a large break for the Olympic winter games from 8 February to 3 March were scheduled. Each team played a total of 56 games (4 times against the division opponents and 2 times against all other teams). The winner of the regular season was awarded the Continental Cup.

Notable events

Opening Cup

The first game of each KHL season is the "Opening Cup" played between the two finalists of the last season. In 2009, the game was played at the TatNeft Arena in Kazan and won by last year's champion Ak Bars Kazan, beating runner-up Lokomotiv Yaroslavl 3–2 in overtime. The two teams were wearing special uniforms with an Opening Cup logo.

Fetisov comeback

On 11 December 2009, Russian hockey legend Viacheslav Fetisov gave a one-game comeback in professional hockey at the age of 51. In this game for CSKA Moscow he played for 8 minutes without a shot on the goal, but it created a very large media interest, not only for himself but also for CSKA Moscow and the KHL.

Mass brawl in Chekhov

On 9 January 2010, in the game between Vityaz Chekhov and Avangard Omsk, a bench-clearing brawl broke out in the 4th minute of the first period, and a bench- and penalty-box-clearing brawl broke out 39 seconds later, forcing the officials to abandon the game, since only four players were left to play. Thirty-three players and both teams' coaches were ejected, and a world record total of 707 penalty minutes were incurred. The KHL imposed fines totaling 5.7 million rubles ($191,000), suspended seven players, and counted the game as a 5–0 defeat for both teams, with no points being awarded.

All-Star Game

The 2nd KHL All-star game was played on 30 January 2010 in the new Minsk-Arena in Minsk, Belarus. As in the previous year, Team Jágr won against Team Yashin, this time with a score of 11–8.

Continental Cup

The first Continental Cup in the KHL history was won by Salavat Yulaev Ufa on 5 March 2010, after the club became unreachable by other clubs in the KHL standings one game before the end of the regular season, and extended their regular-season winning streak to three.

League standings

Source: khl.ru

Points are awarded as follows:
3 Points for a win in regulation ("W")
2 Points for a win in overtime ("OTW") or penalty shootout ("SOW")
1 Point for a loss in a penalty shootout ("SOL") or overtime ("OTL")
0 Points for a loss in regulation ("L")

Conference standings

The conference standings will determine the seedings for the play-offs. The first two places in each conference are reserved for the division leaders.

1 The KHL decided that as a result of the game between Vityaz Chekhov and Avangard Omsk on 9 January 2010 being abandoned due to a mass brawl which left neither team having the required number of players to continue, the game counted as a 5–0 defeat for both teams with no points being awarded.

Divisional standings
Western Conference

 

Eastern Conference

League leaders

Source: khl.ru

Goaltenders: minimum 20 games played

Scoring leaders
Source: khl.ru

GP = Games played; G = Goals; A = Assists; Pts = Points; +/– = Plus-minus; PIM = Penalty minutes

Leading goaltenders 
Source: khl.ru

GP = Games played; Min = Minutes played; W = Wins; L = Losses; SOL = Shootout losses; GA = Goals against; SO = Shutouts; SV% = Save percentage; GAA = Goals against average

Playoffs

The eight best teams of each conference qualified for the playoffs. The first three rounds are played within the conferences, then the two winners will play in the Gagarin Cup final. The playoffs started on 10 March 2010 and ended on 27 April with the seventh game of the Gagarin Cup final. Remarkably, each of all the fifteen play-off series was won by the team which won the first game in the series.

Playoff leaders

Source: khl.ru

Goaltenders: minimum 5 games played

Scoring leaders
Source: khl.ru

  
GP = Games played; G = Goals; A = Assists; Pts = Points; +/– = Plus-minus; PIM = Penalty minutes

Leading goaltenders 
Source: khl.ru

GP = Games played; Min = Minutes played; W = Wins; L = Losses; GA = Goals against; SO = Shutouts; SV% = Save percentage; GAA = Goals against average

Final standings

Awards

Players of the Month

Best KHL players of each month.

KHL Awards
On 25 May 2010, the KHL held their annual award ceremony. A total of 20 different awards were handed out to teams, players, officials and media. The most important trophies are listed in the table below.

The league also awarded six "Golden Helmets" for the members of the all-star team:

References 

 
2009-10
1
1